Ickenham is a London Underground station located in Ickenham in the London Borough of Hillingdon.
The station is on the Uxbridge branch of both the Metropolitan line and Piccadilly line, between Ruislip and Hillingdon stations. It is in Travelcard Zone 6.

History

The Metropolitan Railway (Harrow and Uxbridge Railway) constructed the line through Ickenham between Harrow on the Hill and Uxbridge and commenced services on 4 July 1904 with, initially, the only intermediate stop being at Ruislip. At first, services were operated by steam trains, but track electrification was completed in the subsequent months and electric trains began operating on 1 January 1905.

Progressive development in the north Middlesex area over the next two decades led to the gradual opening of additional stations along the Uxbridge branch to encourage the growth of new residential areas. On 25 September 1905 a small halt was opened as Ickenham Halt by the Metropolitan Railway, following lobbying by the Ickenham Parish Council. The railway company had been reluctant to open a station in the area due to a perceived lack of revenue and so a compromise was reached with the halt.

The new halt brought with it travellers from London seeking a day out in rural surroundings. Villagers living near the halt sold flowers from their gardens and served teas. The parish council later requested shelters for passengers on the platforms, which were built in December 1905. A booking hut followed in 1910. The platforms, which had been too short for trains to call at fully, were extended in 1922.

On 1 March 1910, an extension of the District line from South Harrow to connect with the Metropolitan Railway at Rayners Lane was opened, enabling District line trains to serve stations between Rayners Lane and Uxbridge from that date. On 23 October 1933 District line services were replaced by Piccadilly line trains.

The station was rebuilt into its present form between 1970 and 1971 replacing the 'halt' structures dating from 1905.

In 2018, it was announced that the station would gain step free access by 2022, as part of a £200m investment to increase the number of accessible stations on the Tube.

Services

Metropolitan line 
The Metropolitan Line is the only line to operate an express service, though currently for Metropolitan Line trains on the Uxbridge branch this is eastbound only in the morning peaks (06:30 to 09:30) Monday to Friday.

The off-peak service in trains per hour (tph) is:
 8tph Eastbound to Aldgate via Baker Street (all stations)
 8tph Westbound to Uxbridge

The morning peak service in trains per hour (tph) is:
 2tph Eastbound to Aldgate via Baker Street (semi-fast)
 4tph Eastbound to Aldgate via Baker Street (all stations)
 4tph Eastbound to Baker Street (all stations)
 10tph Westbound to Uxbridge

The evening peak service in trains per hour (tph) is:
 7tph Eastbound to Aldgate via Baker Street (all stations)
 3tph Eastbound to Baker Street (all stations)
 10tph Westbound to Uxbridge

Piccadilly line

Between Rayners Lane and Uxbridge there is no Piccadilly Line service before approximately 06:30 (Monday – Friday) and 08:45 (Saturday – Sunday), except for one early morning
departure from Uxbridge at 05:18 (Monday – Saturday) and 06:46 (Sunday).

The off-peak service in trains per hour (tph) is:
 3tph Eastbound to Cockfosters
 3tph Westbound to Uxbridge

The peak time service in trains per hour (tph) is:
 6tph Eastbound to Cockfosters
 6tph Westbound to Uxbridge

Connections
London Buses routes U10 and 278 serve the station.

References

External links

 
  Ickenham station in 1933

Former Metropolitan Railway stations
Metropolitan line stations
Piccadilly line stations
Railway stations in Great Britain opened in 1905
Tube stations in the London Borough of Hillingdon